Charles L. Burgreen (March 6, 1924 - January 20, 2006) was suffragan bishop for the Armed Forces in the Episcopal Church of the United States of America.

External links 
Burgreen Elected Bishop For Armed Forces

1924 births
2006 deaths
United States Army officers
United States Army chaplains
20th-century American Episcopalians
Episcopal bishops for the Armed Forces (United States)
20th-century American clergy